Rodolfo Guillén (born 25 July 1986) is a Paraguayan footballer.

He has played for Cobreloa, Independiente F.B.C., among others.

References
 

1986 births
Living people
People from Capiatá
Paraguayan footballers
Paraguayan expatriate footballers
12 de Octubre Football Club players
Sport Colombia footballers
Independiente F.B.C. footballers
Cobreloa footballers
Club Olimpia (Itá) players
Expatriate footballers in Chile
Association football midfielders